XHMAXX-FM is a radio station on 98.1 FM in San Martín Texmelucan, Puebla. The station is owned by Cinco Radio and known as Stereo Max, carrying a grupera format.

History
XHMAXX received its first concession on June 8, 1993 as XHSTX-FM, owned by Teleradio de Teziutlán, S.A. de C.V. The station was sold to Radio XHMAXX, S.A. de C.V., in 1998; the station may have signed on under the XHMAXX calls, and it certainly did not have them by 1999 when the callsign was reassigned in Santiago Tuxtla, Veracruz.

References

Radio stations in Puebla
Radio stations established in 1993